Slight or slights may refer to:

 Slight, an intentional discourtesy
 Slighting, the deliberate destruction of a fortification to reduce its value

Arts and entertainment
 Slights (novel) (2009), a horror novel by Kaaron Warren
 "Slight", a song from the 2002 hip hop album Circle by Boom Bip and Doseone

People
 Aaron Slight (born 1966), former professional motorcycle road racer
 George Henry Slight (1859–1934), Scottish engineer
 Jim Slight (1855–1930), Australian cricketer

See also
 Sleight (disambiguation)

 Slite, a locality in Sweden